Green River State Park is a state park on the west shore of the Green River in Green River, Emery County, Utah.

Features
The park consists of a nine-hole golf course, a campground shaded with cottonwood trees, and a boat ramp.

The Green River supports catfish, carp, and four unique endemic native fish that are threatened with extinction and protected: the Colorado pikeminnow, razorback sucker, humpback chub, and bonytail chub. While people are permitted to fish in the park, anglers are expected to release any of the unique fish.

Green River State Park is a popular embarkation point for float trips through the Green River's Labyrinth and Stillwater Canyons.

Green River
The Green River, a tributary of the Colorado River, originates in Wyoming, where it flows 291 miles before entering the state of Utah. It runs for 42 miles in Colorado, and once journeying into Utah, runs another 397 miles. The confluence of the Green and Colorado Rivers is in Canyonlands National Park.

See also
 
 Utah State Parks

References

External links

 Official Green River State Park website

State parks of Utah
Green River (Colorado River tributary)
Protected areas of Emery County, Utah
Protected areas on the Colorado River
Protected areas established in 1965
1965 establishments in Utah